Sowme'eh Sara County is in Gilan province, Iran. The capital of the county is the city of Sowme'eh Sara. At the 2006 census, the county's population was 129,629 in 35,636 households. The following census in 2011 counted 127,757 people in 39,238 households. At the 2016 census, the county's population was 125,074 in 41,975 households. This county is located in the west of Gilan and is surrounded by Fuman County, Masal County, and Bandar-e Anzali County.

Administrative divisions

The population history of Sowme'eh Sara County's administrative divisions over three consecutive censuses is shown in the following table. The latest census shows three districts, seven rural districts, and three cities.

References

 

Counties of Gilan Province